Mark Bridges may refer to:

Mark Bridges, 3rd Baron Bridges (born 1954), solicitor to members of the British royal family
Mark Bridges (costume designer), American costume designer

See also
Mark Bridge (born 1985), Australian soccer player